Lake Clarke in Pennsylvania is a man-made lake along the Susquehanna River formed by the Safe Harbor Dam, a public works project of the 1930s Great Depression and one of the electrification projects of the New Deal.

Safe Harbor Water Power Corporation provides picnic areas, boat ramps, playgrounds and other public recreation facilities at several locations on both sides of the lake.

Lake Clarke is home to Long Level Marina, Safe Harbor's boat-access areas, Susquehanna Yacht Club, Lake Clarke Rescue Inc., and two private marinas that are located on the York County side of the lake. The United States Coast Guard Auxiliary has several flotillas of Division 19 (5th Northern Region) that patrol the area of Lake Clarke and is based out of Station Long Level located on the York side of the lake.

See also
List of lakes in Pennsylvania

References

Bodies of water of Lancaster County, Pennsylvania
Bodies of water of York County, Pennsylvania
Clarke
Susquehanna River